Pachydactylus labialis, commonly known as the Calvinia thick-toed gecko, Western Cape gecko, or Western Cape thick-toed gecko, is a gecko species endemic to the Western and Northern Cape in South Africa, often found taking shelter under stones.

Geographic range
P. labialis is endemic to the arid western parts of South Africa. One common name refers to the town of Calvinia in the Namakwaland.

Description

From above it is greyish brown with irregular dark markings and lighter spots arranged in stripes over the back.

The labial scales (on the mouth) are dark brown and creamy white, giving the appearance of striped lips.

The original tail has dark brown to blackish crossbars, but regenerated tails are more spotted.

See also
 Snake scales

References

Further reading
Branch, Bill. 2004. Field Guide to Snakes and other Reptiles of Southern Africa. Third Revised edition, Second impression. Sanibel Island, Florida: Ralph Curtis Books. 399 pp. . (Pachydactylus labialis, p. 253 + Plate 82).
FitzSimons V. 1938. "Transvaal Museum Expedition to South-West Africa and Little Namaqualand, May to August 1937. Reptiles and Amphibians". Annals of the Transvaal Museum 19 (2): 153–209. (Pachydactylus capensis labialis, new subspecies, pp. 168–170, figure 7).
Kluge AG. 1993. Gekkonoid Lizard Taxonomy. Ann Arbor, Michigan: International Gecko Society. 245 pp.

External links
 Pachydactylus labialis.
 www.pachydactylus.com.
 "Pachydactylus labialis ". The Reptile Database.

L
Endemic reptiles of South Africa
Natural history of Cape Town
Reptiles described in 1938
Taxa named by Vivian Frederick Maynard FitzSimons
Lizards of Africa
Reptiles of South Africa